Laos has  of  standard gauge railways, primarily consisting of the Boten–Vientiane railway, which opened in December 2021. It also has a  metre gauge railway at Thanaleng terminus connected to Thailand's railway system.

History

Due to the mountainous geography of Laos, the country has not had substantial railway infrastructure, thus traditionally rail transport has not played a significant part in Laos's transport sector.

A short portage railway, the Don Det – Don Khon narrow gauge railway, was built by the French while Laos was a part of French Indochina. The railway crossed over the islands of Don Det and Don Khon, enabling vessels, freight and passengers to travel along the Mekong River, avoiding the Khone falls which prevented navigation. The railway was abandoned and fell into disrepair, although some of the infrastructure is still in place.

In the late 1920s, work began on the Thakhek–Tan Ap railway, that would have run between Thakhek, Khammouane Province and Tân Ấp Railway Station, Quảng Bình Province, Vietnam through the Mụ Giạ Pass. However, the scheme was eventually scrapped in the 1930s.

It was only until the 2009 opening of the railway link from Vientiane to Thailand, as well as the 2021 opening of the Boten–Vientiane railway spanning across northern Laos to link with China, that rail transport came into prominence in Laos. The railways both lie on the major railway corridor of the Kunming–Singapore railway's central line, and are also a key developmental project in Laos' national goal to become a "land-linked" economy.

Link to Thailand

Test trains began running on 4 July 2008, and Princess Maha Chakri Sirindhorn of Thailand formally inaugurated the line on 5 March 2009. As of November 2010, Lao officials plan to convert the station into a rail cargo terminal for freight trains, allowing cargo to be transported from Bangkok into Laos more cheaply than via road. The Vientiane Logistics Park opened in December 2021. A shuttle train runs twice a day between the Nong Khai railway station and Thanaleng railway station. Also occasionally the Eastern and Oriental Express.

This rail link is being expanded into Vientiane city itself, with services set to begin in mid-2023 to the new Khamsavath station in Vientiane.

Link to Vietnam

A line between Savannakhet and Lao Bao (Vietnam) has been planned since 2012. A line between Vientiane, and Vũng Áng port in Hà Tĩnh Province (Vietnam) via Mụ Giạ Pass has also been discussed since 2007.

In July 2022, the Lao government announced a feasibility study into the Laos-Vietnam Railway Project. This would involve the construction of a rail line in two phases. The initial phase would connect Thakhek and Vung Ang seaport in Vietnam, a distance of 139 kilometres. The second phase would connect Thakhek with Vientiane with a 312 kilometre rail line.

Link to China 

Laos has a long history of negotiating with China regarding the possibility of a joint railway project. After many years of delays and negotiations, by 2015, both countries agreed upon a revised plan and would jointly finance and operate the railway under a build-operate-transfer arrangement. Construction work worth US$1.2 billion was awarded to the China Railway Group in September 2015.

The railway was planned to link the capital Vientiane with the town of Boten at the border with China. Construction began at Luang Prabang on 25 December 2016, and the line was officially opened on 3 December 2021. The cost of the project is estimated at US$5.965 billion or RMB 37.425 billion. The railway is funded by 60% of debt financing ($3.6 billion) from the Export-Import Bank of China and the remaining 40% ($2.4 billion) is funded by a joint venture company between the two countries, in which China holds 70% stake.

See also
 Boten–Vientiane railway
 Kunming–Singapore railway
 Transport in Laos

References